Kurt Olssons julkalender ("Kurt Olsson's Christmas Calendar") was the Sveriges Television's Christmas calendar in 1990.

Plot 
Kurt Olsson and Arne are doing Christmas decorations inside a barn. in Swedish Lapland.

References

External links 
 

1990 Swedish television series debuts
1990 Swedish television series endings
Sveriges Television's Christmas calendar
Swedish television shows featuring puppetry